Joseph E. Scherger, M.D., M.P.H., (born August 29, 1950) is medical director of Restore Health – Disease Reversal in Indian Wells, California. He is the former vice president for primary care and the Marie E. Pinnizzotto, MD Chair of academic affairs at Eisenhower Medicine Center in Rancho Mirage, California.  Scherger is clinical professor of family medicine at the Keck School of Medicine at the University of Southern California (USC).  His main focus are nutrition and wellness, and the redesign of office practice using the tools of information technology and quality improvement.

Originally from Delphos, Ohio, Scherger graduated from the University of Dayton in 1971, summa cum laude.  He graduated from the UCLA School of Medicine in 1975, and was elected to Alpha Omega Alpha.  He completed a family medicine residency and a Master of Public Health from the Department of Health Services at the University of Washington in 1978.  From 1978 to 80, he served in the National Health Service Corps in Dixon, California, as a migrant health physician.  From 1981 to 1992, Scherger divided his time between private practice in Dixon and teaching medical students and residents at UC Davis.  From 1988 to 1991, he was a Fellow in the Kellogg National Fellowship Program, focusing on health care reform and quality of life.  From 1992 to 1996, he was vice president for Family Practice and Primary Care Education at Sharp HealthCare in San Diego.  From 1996 to 2001, he was the chair of the Department of Family Medicine and the associate dean for primary care at the University of California Irvine.  From 2001 to 2003, Scherger served as founding dean of the Florida State University College of Medicine.

Scherger was recognized as a “Top Doc” in San Diego for six consecutive years, 2004–2009. He was voted Outstanding Clinical Instructor at the University of California, Davis School of Medicine in 1984, 1989 and 1990.  In 1989, he was Family Physician of the Year by the American Academy of Family Physicians and the California Academy of Family Physicians.  In 1986, he was president of the Society of Teachers of Family Medicine.  In 1992, Scherger was elected to the Institute of Medicine of the National Academy of Sciences.  In 1994, he received the Thomas W. Johnson Award for Family Practice Education from the American Academy of Family Physicians.  In 2000, he was selected by the UC Irvine medical students for the AAMC Humanism in Medicine Award. He received the Recognition Award from the Society of Teachers of Family Medicine in 2012.  He served on the Institute of Medicine Committee on the Quality of Health Care in America from 1998 to 2001. Scherger served on the board of directors of the American Academy of Family Physicians and the American Board of Family Medicine.  From 2005 to 2010 he served as Consulting Medical Director for Quality and Informatics at Lumetra Healthcare Solutions.

Scherger serves on the editorial board of Medical Economics. He was the Men’s Health expert and a consultant for Revolution Health, 2006–09, and he has covered California for eDocAmerica since 2003. He was editor-in-chief of Hippocrates, published by the Massachusetts Medical Society, from 1999 to 2001.  He was the first medical editor of Family Practice Management.  He has authored more than 500 medical publications and has given over 1100 invited presentations.

Scherger has published 2 books, 40 Years in Family Medicine, a collection of his writings from 1974 to 2014, and Lean and Fit: A Doctor's Journey to Healthy Nutrition and Greater Wellness.  He enjoys an active family life with his wife, Carol, and two sons, Adrian and Gabriel.  He is an avid runner who has completed 40 marathons, five 50 mile and ten 50K ultramarathon trail runs.

References

American primary care physicians
David Geffen School of Medicine at UCLA alumni
Living people
1950 births
University of Dayton alumni
University of Washington School of Public Health alumni
People from Dixon, California
Family physicians
Members of the National Academy of Medicine